Darren Reid (born May 8, 1983) is a Canadian Métis former professional ice hockey right winger who played 21 National Hockey League (NHL) games for the Tampa Bay Lightning and Philadelphia Flyers. In 2018, he accepted a role as an assistant coach for the Drayton Valley Thunder.

Playing career
Reid played three seasons of junior hockey with the Drayton Valley Thunder of the Alberta Junior Hockey League before joining the Western Hockey League (WHL).

Reid was drafted 256th overall by the Tampa Bay Lightning in the 2002 NHL Entry Draft, however he returned to the WHL for the next two seasons where he helped the Medicine Hat Tigers win the 2004 WHL Championship. In 2005, Reid attended the Lightning's training camp but was reassigned to their American Hockey League (AHL) affiliate, the Springfield Falcons, prior to the 2005–06 season. Reid was recalled from the AHL on December 16 after recording 10 points in 21 games. He played his first career NHL game the following night on December 17, 2005, against the Detroit Red Wings and was reassigned to the AHL on December 27.
 
Reid was traded to the Philadelphia Flyers on November 9, 2006, for Daniel Corso. After two seasons with the Flyers AHL affiliate, the Philadelphia Phantoms, Reid signed a one year contract with the Hershey Bears for the 2008–09 season. He won the Calder Cup with the Bears that season. After playing a few games in the ECHL, Reid then signed a contract with the Heilbronn Falcons for the rest of the 2009–10 season.

After retiring from hockey, Reid joined the Drayton Valley Thunder as an assistant coach in 2018.

Career statistics

References

External links
  https://darrenreid.ca 

1983 births
Canadian ice hockey right wingers
Hershey Bears players
Ice hockey people from Alberta
Living people
Medicine Hat Tigers players
People from Lac La Biche County
Philadelphia Flyers players
Philadelphia Phantoms players
Reading Royals players
South Carolina Stingrays players
Springfield Falcons players
Tampa Bay Lightning draft picks
Tampa Bay Lightning players
Métis sportspeople